Lake Escara is a former lake in the southern Altiplano.

The Lake Escara lake episode was first defined in 1978, along with Lake Minchin and Lake Tauca. Today the Altiplano hosts Lake Titicaca in the north and Lake Poopo, Salar de Coipasa and Salar de Uyuni in the south. Escara was identified in the central Altiplano, it may be the oldest Altiplano lake cycle.

The lake was probably sizable, perhaps reaching the size of Lake Tauca and Ouki.

It is dated to 191,000 years BP. This date is of a tuff associated with lake deposits, the deposits themselves have not been dated. This tuff was found in the L5 sediment unit of Salar de Uyuni which has been linked to Escara. The S10 layer in Salar de Uyuni is another layer linked to Lake Escara. Some tuffs found in Escara lake deposits have been dated to about 1.87 million years ago.

References

Sources 

 
 

Geology of Bolivia
Former lakes of South America
Lakes of Bolivia
Pleistocene